High Anxiety is the debut solo album by British musician Thom Sonny Green. It was composed and recorded by Green from 2014 to 2016, while he was touring with alt-J, and was released on 19 August 2016 by Infectious and Sudden Records. The album received mixed reviews by critics.

Background and recording
Green started producing in 2012, using his laptop. He composed and recorded the album over the course of two years while touring with alt-J, in hotel rooms. In the process, he used Ableton Live and a short music gear, including Bass Station II and OP-1 synthesisers, a H2n recorder, and a Game Boy.

Music
High Anxiety is an electronica, ambient and experimental album. Green cited Clams Casino, Arca, Deftones and Radiohead as influences on the record. The title of the album refers to Green's "general anxiety".

Critical reception

High Anxiety received mixed reviews by music critics, many of whom found the album overlong. At Metacritic, which assigns a normalised rating out of 100 to reviews from mainstream publications, it received an average score of 57, based on 7 reviews.

Track listing

References

2016 debut albums
Thom Sonny Green albums
Infectious Music albums